"Halls of Illusions" is the first single by American hip hop duo Insane Clown Posse from their fourth studio album, The Great Milenko. The song shows their hate towards child abuse and domestic violence and the damage their victims suffer. The lyrics speak about child abusers and woman beaters who take a hellish amusement park ride representing a fun-house to reflect upon their actions, as they are shown the consequences of their ways as they pass through the "Halls of Illusions". These illusions shows what could have been their lives if they chose to be better people instead of living a life inflicting violence and pain upon their families who have been destroyed by the abuse. The clean version of the music video removes all language and graphic violence by changing the lyrics. Slash (the Guns N' Roses guitarist) was featured in the song performing background rhythm guitar.

External links
 

Insane Clown Posse songs
Songs about domestic violence
Songs about child abuse
Horrorcore songs
Music videos directed by Kevin Kerslake